These hits topped the Ultratop 50 in 1996.

See also
1996 in music

References

1996 in Belgium
1996 record charts
1996